A hot cross bun is a spiced sweet bun usually made with fruit, marked with a cross on the top, and has been traditionally eaten on Good Friday in the United Kingdom, Ireland, Australia, New Zealand, South Africa, Canada, India, Pakistan and the United States. They are available all year round in some places, including the UK.

The bun marks the end of the Christian season of Lent and different parts of the hot cross bun have a certain meaning, including the cross representing the crucifixion of Jesus, and the spices inside signifying the spices used to embalm him at his burial and may also include orange peel to reflect the bitterness of his time on the Cross.

History
The Greeks in 6th century AD may have marked cakes with a cross.

One theory is that the contemporary hot cross bun originates from St Albans, in England, where, in 1361, Brother Thomas Rodcliffe, a 14th-century monk at St Albans Abbey, developed a similar recipe called an 'Alban Bun' and distributed the bun to the local poor on Good Friday.

In 1592, during the reign of Elizabeth I of England, the London Clerk of Markets issued a decree forbidding the sale of hot cross buns and other spiced breads, except at burials, on Good Friday, or at Christmas. The punishment for transgressing the decree was forfeiture of all the forbidden product to the poor. As a result of this decree, hot cross buns at the time were primarily made in domestic kitchens. Further attempts to suppress the sale of these items took place during the reign of James I of England (1603–1625).

The first definite record of hot cross buns comes from a London street cry: "Good Friday comes this month, the old woman runs. With one or two a penny hot cross buns", which appeared in Poor Robin's Almanac for 1733. The line "One a penny, two a penny, hot cross-buns" appears in the English nursery rhyme "Hot Cross Buns" published in the London Chronicle for 2–4 June 1767. Food historian Ivan Day states, "The buns were made in London during the 18th century. But when you start looking for records or recipes earlier than that, you hit nothing."

Traditions

English folklore includes many superstitions surrounding hot cross buns. One of them says that buns baked and served on Good Friday will not spoil or grow mouldy during the subsequent year. Another encourages keeping such a bun for medicinal purposes. A piece of it given to someone ill is said to help them recover.

If taken on a sea voyage, hot cross buns are said to protect against shipwreck. If hung in the kitchen, they are said to protect against fires and ensure that all breads turn out perfectly. The hanging bun is replaced each year.

Other versions
In the United Kingdom, the major supermarkets produce variations on the traditional recipe such as toffee, orange-cranberry, salted caramel and chocolate, and apple-cinnamon.

In Australia, coffee-flavoured buns are also sold in some bakeries. There are also sticky date and caramel versions as well as mini versions of the traditional bun. Other newer variations that can be purchased from major supermarkets include chocolate chip, chocolate and cherry, butterscotch, apple and cinnamon, banana and caramel, jalapeño and cheese, and white chocolate and raspberry.

In Slovakia and in the Czech Republic, mazanec is a similar cake or sweet bread eaten at Easter. It often has a cross marked on top.

The cross

The traditional method for making the cross on top of the bun is to use shortcrust pastry, though some 21st century recipes recommended a paste of flour and water.

See also

 Pesaha Appam
 Bath bun
 Fruit bun
 Sally Lunn bun
 List of British breads
 List of buns
 List of foods with religious symbolism
 Semla

References

Australian breads
British breads
Buns
Catholic cuisine
Christmas food
Easter bread
English cuisine
English traditions
New Zealand breads
Sweet breads
Yeast breads